Pachycerianthus is a genus of marine tube-dwelling anemones in the family Cerianthidae.

Species 

The following species were included in the genus  according to the World Register of Marine Species:

Pachycerianthus aestuarii (Torrey & Kleeburger, 1909)
Pachycerianthus borealis (Verrill, 1873)
Pachycerianthus curacaoensis Den Hartog, 1977
Pachycerianthus delwynae Carter, 1995
Pachycerianthus dohrni (Van Beneden, 1923)
Pachycerianthus fimbriatus McMurrich, 1910
Pachycerianthus insignis Carlgren, 1951
Pachycerianthus johnsoni (Torrey & Kleeburger, 1909)
Pachycerianthus longistriatus Carter, 1995
Pachycerianthus magnus (Nakamoto, 1919)
Pachycerianthus maua (Carlgren, 1900)
Pachycerianthus monostichus McMurrich, 1910
Pachycerianthus multiplicatus Carlgren, 1912
Pachycerianthus nobilis (Haddon & Shackleton, 1893)
Pachycerianthus schlenzae Stampar, Morandini & Silveira, 2014
Pachycerianthus solitarius (Rapp, 1829)
Pachycerianthus torreyi Arai, 1965

References

External links 

Cerianthidae
Anthozoa genera